Gordon Kirkby (born 26 September 1958) was a member of the House of Commons of Canada for the riding of Prince Albert—Churchill River from 1993 to 1997.

History

Kirkby was first elected to Prince Albert City Council as an alderman in October 1985. Kirkby was mayor of his home town Prince Albert from 1988 until 1993, when he won the riding of Prince Albert—Churchill River in the 1993 federal election as a member of the Liberal party. He was the Parliamentary Secretary to the Minister of Justice and Attorney General of Canada from 23 February 1996 to 1 June 1997.  Kirkby lost to Reform party candidate Derrek Konrad in the 1997 election, finishing third in the riding, which had been restructured as Prince Albert.

After he left Canadian politics, Kirkby moved to Winnipeg, Manitoba and began a consulting career. He made an unsuccessful bid to become Winnipeg's mayor in the 2004 by-election.

Gordon Kirkby moved back to Prince Albert in June 2005 and started up his own law firm. Kirkby took on a partner later on in Philip Fourie, making their law firm Kirkby Fourie Law.

In the 2015 Canadian federal election, Kirkby attempted a federal political comeback in the riding of Prince Albert, which was unsuccessful.  Running against Conservative incumbent Randy Hoback, Kirkby placed third.

Personal life
Kirkby is married to author Mary-Ann Kirkby.

Electoral record

References

External links
 

1958 births
Living people
Liberal Party of Canada MPs
Members of the House of Commons of Canada from Saskatchewan
People from Melfort, Saskatchewan
Saskatchewan municipal councillors
University of Saskatchewan alumni
University of Saskatchewan College of Law alumni